Pythium is a genus of parasitic oomycetes. They were formerly classified as fungi. Most species are plant parasites, but Pythium insidiosum is an important pathogen of animals, causing pythiosis. The feet of the fungus gnat are frequently a vector for their transmission.

Morphology
Hyphae Pythium species, like others in the family Pythiaceae, are usually characterized by their production of coenocytic hyphae without septations.
Oogonia Generally contain a single oospore.
Antheridia Contain an elongated and club-shaped antheridium.

Ecological importance

Pythium-induced root rot is a common crop disease. When the organism kills newly emerged or emerging seedlings, it is known as damping off, and is a very common problem in fields and greenhouses. Thus there is tremendous interest in genetic host resistance, but no crop has ever developed adequate resistance to Pythium. This disease complex usually involves other pathogens such as Phytophthora and Rhizoctonia. Pythium wilt is caused by zoospore infection of older plants, leading to biotrophic infections that become necrotrophic in response to colonization/reinfection pressures or environmental stress, leading to minor or severe wilting caused by impeded root functioning.

Many Pythium species, along with their close relatives Phytophthora, are plant pathogens of economic importance in agriculture.  Pythium spp. tend to be very generalistic and unspecific in their  large range of hosts, while Phytophthora spp. are generally more host-specific.

For this reason, Pythium spp. are more devastating in the root rot they cause in crops, because crop rotation alone often does not eradicate the pathogen as Pythium spp. are also good saprotrophs, and survive for a long time on decaying plant matter.

In field crops, damage by Pythium spp. is often limited to the area affected, as the motile zoospores require ample surface water to travel long distances.  Additionally, the capillaries formed by soil particles act as a natural filter and effectively trap many zoospores.  However, in hydroponic systems inside greenhouses, where extensive monocultures of plants are maintained in plant nutrient solution (containing nitrogen, potassium, phosphate, and micronutrients) that is continuously recirculated to the crop, Pythium spp. cause extensive and devastating root rot and is often difficult to prevent or control. The root rot affects entire operations (tens of thousands of plants, in many instances) within two to four days due to the inherent nature of hydroponic systems where roots are nakedly exposed to the water medium, in which the zoospores can move freely. Various Pythium populations have been known to have resistance to mefenoxam since the 1980s and metalaxyl since 1984.

Several Pythium species, including P. oligandrum, P. nunn, P. periplocum, and P. acanthicum, are mycoparasites of plant pathogenic fungi and oomycetes, and have received interest as potential biocontrol agents.

Species

Pythium acanthicum
Pythium acanthophoron
Pythium acrogynum
Pythium adhaerens
Pythium amasculinum
Pythium anandrum
Pythium angustatum
Pythium aphanidermatum
Pythium apleroticum
Pythium aquatile
Pythium aristosporum
Pythium arrhenomanes
Pythium attrantheridium
Pythium bifurcatum
Pythium boreale
Pythium buismaniae
Pythium butleri
Pythium camurandrum
Pythium campanulatum
Pythium canariense
Pythium capillosum
Pythium carbonicum
Pythium carolinianum
Pythium catenulatum
Pythium chamaehyphon
Pythium chondricola
Pythium citrinum
Pythium coloratum
Pythium conidiophorum
Pythium contiguanum
Pythium cryptoirregulare
Pythium cucurbitacearum
Pythium cylindrosporum
Pythium cystogenes
Pythium debaryanum
Pythium deliense
Pythium destruens
Pythium diclinum
Pythium dimorphum
Pythium dissimile
Pythium dissotocum
Pythium echinulatum
Pythium emineosum
Pythium erinaceum
Pythium flevoense
Pythium folliculosum
Pythium glomeratum
Pythium graminicola
Pythium grandisporangium
Pythium guiyangense
Pythium helicandrum
Pythium helicoides
Pythium heterothallicum
Pythium hydnosporum
Pythium hypogynum
Pythium indigoferae
Pythium inflatum
Pythium insidiosum
Pythium intermedium
Pythium irregulare
Pythium iwayamae
Pythium jasmonium
Pythium kunmingense
Pythium litorale
Pythium longandrum
Pythium longisporangium
Pythium lutarium
Pythium macrosporum
Pythium mamillatum
Pythium marinum
Pythium marsipium
Pythium mastophorum
Pythium megacarpum
Pythium middletonii
Pythium minus
Pythium monospermum
Pythium montanum
Pythium multisporum
Pythium myriotylum
Pythium nagaii
Pythium nodosum
Pythium nunn
Pythium oedochilum
Pythium okanoganense
Pythium oligandrum
Pythium oopapillum
Pythium ornacarpum
Pythium orthogonon
Pythium ostracodes
Pythium pachycaule
Pythium pachycaule
Pythium paddicum
Pythium paroecandrum
Pythium parvum
Pythium pectinolyticum
Pythium periilum
Pythium periplocum
Pythium perniciosum
Pythium perplexum
Pythium phragmitis
Pythium pleroticum
Pythium plurisporium
Pythium polare
Pythium polymastum
Pythium porphyrae
Pythium prolatum
Pythium proliferatum
Pythium pulchrum
Pythium pyrilobum
Pythium quercum
Pythium radiosum
Pythium ramificatum
Pythium regulare
Pythium rhizo-oryzae
Pythium rhizosaccharum
Pythium rostratifingens
Pythium rostratum
Pythium salpingophorum
Pythium scleroteichum
Pythium segnitium
Pythium spiculum
Pythium spinosum
Pythium splendens
Pythium sterilum
Pythium stipitatum
Pythium sulcatum
Pythium tardicrescens
Pythium terrestris
Pythium torulosum
Pythium tracheiphilum
Pythium ultimum
Pythium ultimum var. ultimum
Pythium uncinulatum
Pythium undulatum
Pythium vanterpoolii
Pythium viniferum
Pythium violae
Pythium volutum
Pythium zingiberis
Pythium zingiberum

Globisporangium sylvaticum was formerly placed here as Pythium sylvaticum

See also 

Pythium in turfgrass
Black rot on orchids

References

Further reading 

 
Water mould plant pathogens and diseases
Water mould genera